Seraing–Aachen–Seraing was a men's cycling race organized for the last time in 2001. The race was run between Seraing, Belgium and Aachen, (West) Germany.

The competition's roll of honor includes the success of Rik Van Looy and Frank Vandenbroucke.

Winners

References 

Cycle races in Belgium
Defunct cycling races in Belgium
1968 establishments in Belgium
2001 disestablishments in Belgium
Recurring sporting events established in 1968
Recurring sporting events disestablished in 2001